Stenoptilia mannii is a moth of the family Pterophoridae. It is found in Bosnia and Herzegovina, North Macedonia, Bulgaria, Greece, Russia, Ukraine, Armenia, Turkey, Iraq, Iran, Uzbekistan, Kazakhstan and Kyrgyzstan.

References

mannii
Moths described in 1852
Plume moths of Asia
Plume moths of Europe
Taxa named by Philipp Christoph Zeller